South Central is an American comedy series that aired on the Fox network from April 5, 1994 to June 7, 1994. It was cancelled following its first season, after ten episodes aired.

Synopsis
The series was set in 1990's  South Central Los Angeles, and dealt with the lives of an African American family, the Moseleys, and issues such as gang violence, drugs, dating, sex, school, and unemployment. Joan Moseley (Tina Lifford) is a divorced mother, raising three children with no assistance from her ex-husband. Her oldest son Marcus having been murdered years earlier by a gang member, Joan's financial situation becomes complicated after she is laid off. Her remaining children include Andre (Larenz Tate), Tasha (Tasha Scott), and foster son Deion Carter (Keith Mbulo). Rounding out the cast of characters are Joan's friend "Sweets" (Paula Kelly) and Andre's mentor Dr. Ray McHenry (Ken Page).

South Central featured many guest stars including Jennifer Lopez, Shar Jackson, and Maia Campbell. The series, which was produced on a smaller budget than most sitcoms, was popular among critics for what was perceived as a realistic and sometimes dark portrayal of urban life.

Cancellation
The show aired on Tuesday evenings following Roc. Due to the decline in ratings of the entire night of programming, Fox cancelled all the shows on that night (as well as Thursday comedies The Sinbad Show and In Living Color). The cancellation of the series, all of which had predominantly black casts, prompted Jesse Jackson to call for a boycott of the network for perceived institutional racism. Fox maintained that the series was low rated and the decision to cancel was not racially motivated.

Series creator Ralph Farquhar would later co-create the UPN sitcom Moesha, along with Sara V. Finney and Vida Spears. The series (a more traditional sitcom) was set in Leimert Park, a middle-class neighborhood near View Park-Windsor Hills Los Angeles. Lamont Bentley and Shar Jackson were members of the cast.

Cast

Main
Tina Lifford — Joan Mosely
Larenz Tate — Andre Mosely
Tasha Scott — Tasha Mosely
Keith Mbulo — Deion Carter

Recurring
Lamont Bentley — Rashad
Paula Kelly — Sweets
Ken Page — Dr. Ray McHenry
Michael Beach - Isaiah Washington
Earl Billings — Mayo Bonner
Maia Campbell — Nicole
Shar Jackson — Shanelle
Jennifer Lopez — Lucille
Clifton Powell — Bobby Deavers
Malinda Williams — Candi

Episodes

Syndication 
Episodes of South Central aired in the United States on TV One.

Awards and nominations

References

External links

1994 American television series debuts
1994 American television series endings
1990s American black sitcoms
1990s American sitcoms
English-language television shows
Fox Broadcasting Company original programming
Television series by 20th Century Fox Television
Television shows set in Los Angeles